Trance Allstars was a collaboration of several German producers of Trance music, mainly releasing cover versions of older trance songs, for example "Go" (originally by Moby). The project were active from year 2000 through 2002 and consisted of:

Taucher
Talla 2XLC
Schiller
ATB
Sunbeam
DJ Mellow-D.

Discography

Studio albums

Singles

References

External links
Official site

German DJs
German trance music groups
Electronic dance music DJs